Catestiasula is a genus of praying mantises belonging to the family Hymenopodidae.

Species:

Catestiasula moultoni 
Catestiasula nitida 
Catestiasula seminigra

References

Hymenopodidae